An orange box is a piece of hardware or software that generates caller ID frequency-shift keying (FSK) signals to spoof caller ID information on the target's caller ID terminal.

See also
 Blue box

References 

Caller ID
Phreaking boxes